2017 Shenzhen Open may refer to:
2017 ATP Shenzhen Open, an ATP World Tour tennis tournament
2017 WTA Shenzhen Open, a WTA Tour tennis tournament

See also
 2017 Shenzhen Open – singles (disambiguation)
 2017 Shenzhen Open – doubles (disambiguation)